Xu Zhimo (Mandarin: , 15 January 1897 – 19 November 1931) was a Chinese romantic poet who strove to loosen Chinese poetry from its traditional forms and to reshape it under the influences of Western poetry and the vernacular Chinese language. He is considered one of the most important figures of modern Chinese poetry.

Biography
Xu Zhimo has several names. He is best known as Xú Zhìmó (Wu IPA: , Wu pinyin: Zhi Tsymu; Mandarin IPA: , Wades-Giles: Hsü Chih-mo), while he was born Xú Zhāngxù with the courtesy name Yǒusēn.

Xu was born in Haining, Zhejiang and graduated from Hangzhou High School, a well-known school in Southern China. He married Zhang Youyi in 1915 and proceeded to attend Peiyang University in 1916 (now Tianjin University) to study law. In 1917, he moved to Peking University (PKU) due to the law department of Peiyang University merging into PKU. In 1918, he traveled to the United States to earn his bachelor's degree at Clark University in Worcester, Massachusetts, where he took up a major in political and social sciences, along with a minor in history. Shortly afterward, he enrolled at Columbia University in New York to pursue a graduate degree in economics and politics in 1919. He left New York in 1921, having found the U.S. "intolerable", to go study in England at King's College, Cambridge, where he fell in love with English Romantic poetry like that of Keats and Shelley.  He was also influenced by the French romantic and symbolist poets, some of whose works he translated into Chinese. In 1922 he returned to China and became a leading figure of the modern poetry movement. In 1923, he founded the Crescent Moon Society, a Chinese literary society that was part of the larger New Culture Movement, believing in "art for art's sake" and often engaging in running debates with the "art for politics' sake" (Chinese Communist Party-driven) League of the Left-Wing Writers. When the Bengali poet Rabindranath Tagore visited China, Xu Zhimo served as one of his oral interpreters. Xu was also renowned for his use of vernacular Chinese; he was one of the first Chinese writers to successfully naturalize Western romantic forms into modern Chinese poetry. He worked as an editor and professor at several schools before his death on 19 November 1931, dying in a plane crash near Jinan and Tai'an, Shandong while flying on a Stinson Detroiter from Nanjing to Beijing. He left behind four collections of verse and several volumes of translations from various languages.

Love affairs
Xu Zhimo's various love affairs with Zhang Youyi, Lin Huiyin, and Lu Xiaoman are well known in China. Xu married Zhang Youyi, (the sister of the politician Zhang Junmai) on 10 October 1915. This was an arranged marriage that went against Xu's belief in free and simple love. Although Zhang gave birth to two sons, Xu still couldn't accept her. While in London in 1921, Xu met and fell in love with Lin Huiyin (the daughter of Lin Changmin). He divorced Zhang in March 1922. Inspired by this newly found love, Xu wrote a large number of poems during this time. Lin and Xu became close friends. However, she was already betrothed to Liang Sicheng by his father. Xu's last lover was Lu Xiaoman, who was married to Wang Geng, a friend of Xu. The marriage had been arranged by her parents and she felt trapped in this loveless marriage. When Xu and Lu met, they quickly bonded over the similarity of their respective experiences with arranged marriages. When it came to be known that they were in love, both were scorned by their parents and friends. Lu divorced her husband in 1925 and married Xu the next year. Their honeymoon period did not last long however and Lu gradually became more and more depressed. Because of Lu's spending habits and Xu's parents refusing to lend them money, Xu had to take several jobs in different cities to keep up with the lifestyle Lu desired. She was widowed when Xu died in an airplane crash.

Xu was also romantically linked to American author Pearl S. Buck and American journalist Agnes Smedley.

In an obituary, writer Wen Yuan-ning commented that Xu's "relations with women are exactly like Shelley's. Let no woman flatter herself that Tse-mo has ever loved her; he has only loved his own inner version of Ideal Beauty."

Airplane crash

On 19 November 1931, Xu prepared to leave Nanking to attend a lecture given by Lin Huiyin at a university in Peking. He boarded a China Airways Federal Stinson Detroiter, an aircraft contracted by Chunghwa Post to deliver airmail on the Nanjing-Beijing route. However, when the flight arrived in the Jinan area, the flight encountered severe fog, leaving the pilot with no clear view to land. The plane descended into the mountainous area below unnoticed as both the pilots were looking for the course according to the map. When the aircraft was aiming to turn left to go back to the course again, it hit the peak of a mountain and broke off the right wing. The plane spun out of control and crashed into the mountains near Jinan City and Tai'an City, in Shandong province. Xu Zhimo, who suffered from fatal cerebral trauma and several cuts on his body, was killed instantly as well as one of the two pilots. The first officer survived the initial impact, but also perished due to the delay in rescue.

The accident was attributed to both pilots' misjudgement of the flight's altitude as well as their failure to recognize the terrain. However, it was rumoured that Xu was murdered, although this was confirmed to be untrue.

Cambridge poem

Xu Zhimo's best-known poem is Zaibie Kangqiao, variously translated into English as "On Leaving Cambridge", "Saying Goodbye to Cambridge Again", "Goodbye Again, Cambridge", "Leaving the Revisited Cambridge" etc. To commemorate Xu, in July 2008, a stone of white Beijing marble was installed at the Backs of King's College, Cambridge (near the bridge over the River Cam).

The one used here (by permission) was translated by Guohua Chen and published in the University of Cambridge's 800th anniversary book, and differs from the one quoted in the carvings of the Xu Zhimo Friendship Garden added around the Memorial stone by King's College in 2018.

References

Further reading
 "Cambridge college love letter tree cuttings sent to China", BBC News September 2018
 Encyclopædia Britannica 2004, 2005 Ultimate Reference Suite DVD, article – "Hsü Chih-mo", now available online as Xu Zhimo
 Chen, Shan, "Xu Zhimo". Encyclopedia of China, first ed.
 "The Late Mr. Hsu Tse-mo: A Child," Wen Yuan-ning and others, Imperfect Understanding: Intimate Portraits of Modern Chinese Celebrities (Amherst, NY: Cambria Press, 2018), pp. 45–47.

External links 

 Xu Zhimo. A Portrait by Kong Kai Ming at Portrait Gallery of Chinese Writers (Hong Kong Baptist University Library).

1897 births
1931 deaths
Republic of China poets
Modern Chinese poetry
Republic of China translators
Hangzhou High School alumni
Columbia Graduate School of Arts and Sciences alumni
Clark University alumni
Alumni of King's College, Cambridge
National University of Peking alumni
French–Chinese translators
Victims of aviation accidents or incidents in China
Tianjin University alumni
Writers from Jiaxing
20th-century Chinese translators
Poets from Zhejiang
20th-century Chinese poets
People from Haining
University of Shanghai alumni